Michel Louvain,  (July 12, 1937April 14, 2021) was a Canadian singer most popular in the 1960s and 1970s. He recorded many hit songs, and also worked as a host for a variety of shows on television and radio. In 1965 he was voted 'Mr. Radio–TV', Radio Canada's top show business personality, at the Gala des Artistes.

Early life
Louvain was born Michel Poulin in Thetford Mines, Quebec, on July 12, 1937.  His father worked as a miner.  Louvain first sang as a child in the choir at his local church.  He was employed as a hardware store decorator during his adolescence.  He consequently moved out of his hometown to pursue a full-time career in singing.  He first relocated to Sherbrooke, before settling down in Montreal.

Career
Louvain began working as a master of ceremonies at a hotel in Laval when he was 20 years old.  He was later signed to Apex Records in the 1960s. His first hit was "Buenas Noches Mi Amor". Over the next 20 years, Louvain made many recordings, including the hit songs "La Dame en bleu" and "Je déclare l'amour au monde entier". His recordings in French were sold internationally in Belgium. His song "C'est Un Secret" reached #14 in the Canadian RPM Magazine Top 40, November 29, 1965.

Louvain was the host of a succession of CFTM-TV (Montreal) and Radio-Canada TV variety shows. His performances attracted mostly young female fans. He first performed in nightclubs, and, when his following grew more mature, in entertainment theatres. In the 1980s, he staged grandiose music-hall shows, with female dancers and scenery, at the Place des Arts and across Quebec, including Autour du monde in 1984.

Later life
Louvain was appointed Knight of the National Order of Quebec in 2010. Five years later, he was named a Member of the Order of Canada. In 2017, as a celebration of his 80th birthday, Louvain set out on a concert tour. One of the concerts was at the Festival d'Été de Québec in Quebec City. He released his 32nd album, La belle vie, in 2019. He was scheduled to tour throughout Quebec from September 2021, beginning in his hometown Thetford Mines.

Louvain died in his sleep on the night of April 14, 2021, at the Hôpital de Verdun in Montreal. He was 83, and suffered from esophageal cancer, which he had been diagnosed with earlier that month. Condolences included the Premier of Quebec François Legault, saying "the people of Quebec have lost an idol", and Canadian Prime Minister Justin Trudeau who described Louvain as "one of Quebec’s greatest singers".

Louvain was gay, but rarely spoke about his private life on the record to the media. He was in a 25-year relationship with Mario Théberge, although the couple did not officially marry until just a few days before Louvain's death in 2021.

Discography
 1958: Michel Louvain
 1959: Ici Michel Louvain
 1961: Après minuit
 1962: Michel Louvain chante ses succès
 1962: Toi et moi
 1964: Michel
 1965: Aloha
 1965: Cœur à chœur
 1966: Un peu plus de chanson
 1967: Formi... formidable
 1968: Souvenirs exotiques
 1969: Michel Louvain chante Marie
 1973: Ma vie, c'est l'amour
 1974: La Grande kermesse western
 1974: La Dame en bleu
 1978: En spectacle au Grand Théâtre de Québec
 1979: En harmonie
 1979: Message d'amour et de paix
 1980: Michel Louvain 1980
 1982: Michel Louvain: 1957–1982
 1984: Michel Louvain
 1986: Il faut s'aimer
 1988: Noël avec vous
 1988: L'Amour sera toujours l'amour
 1989: Romantique
 1993: Je déclare l'amour
 1997: La collection Michel Louvain – Les grands succès
 2002: Les Grands Succès
 2007: Chante Noël
 2015: Gentleman Crooner

References

External links
 
 
 
 Michel Louvain at The Canadian Encyclopedia

1937 births
2021 deaths
20th-century Canadian male singers
21st-century Canadian male singers
Apex Records artists
Deaths from esophageal cancer
Deaths from cancer in Quebec
French-language singers of Canada
French Quebecers
Canadian LGBT singers
Members of the Order of Canada
People from Thetford Mines
Singers from Quebec
Canadian gay musicians
20th-century Canadian LGBT people
21st-century Canadian LGBT people